John Young Radcliff (June 29, 1848 – July 26, 1911) was an American professional baseball player who played for the Philadelphia Athletics, Baltimore Canaries (–), Philadelphia Whites, and Philadelphia Centennials. He was primarily a shortstop.

Radcliff debuted with the Philadelphia Athletics of the National Association on May 20, 1871. In 28 games, he hit for a .303 batting average with 0 home runs and 22 runs batted in. He also had 5 stolen bases in his first year. The next year, playing for the Baltimore Canaries, he hit his first career home run and picked up 44 RBIs. He recorded 4 triples as well.

In 1873, playing for Baltimore, Radcliff hit a career high 13 doubles and had 33 runs batted in, with a .286 batting average. In 1874, playing for the Philadelphia Whites, he hit his second and final career home run, tying for the team lead in homers with George Bechtel.

In 1874, Radcliff was expelled from baseball for offering an umpire 175 dollars to help the Chicago White Stockings win a game.

Radcliff played his last season in 1875 with the Philadelphia Centennials, appearing in only 5 games, hitting a mediocre .174 with no home runs and no RBI. His final game was on May 24.

Radcliff died in Ocean City, New Jersey, on July 26, 1911 at the age of 63.

See also
Denny Mack – the Radcliff affair

References

External links

1848 births
1911 deaths
19th-century baseball players
Major League Baseball shortstops
Philadelphia Athletics (NABBP) players
Philadelphia Keystones (NABBP) players
Philadelphia Athletics (NA) players
Baltimore Canaries players
Philadelphia White Stockings players
Philadelphia Centennials players
Baseball players from Philadelphia